Jamaica Time (JAM) is the official time in Jamaica. It is five hours behind Coordinated Universal Time (UTC−05:00). Jamaica has only one time zone and does not observe daylight saving time. During winter, Jamaican Time is equivalent to North American Eastern Standard Time, whereas in the summer it is equivalent to Central Daylight Time.

IANA time zone database
In the IANA time zone database Jamaica has the following time zone:
 America/Jamaica (JM)

References

External links
Time in Jamaica